Beauties of the Night may refer to:
 Beauties of the Night (1952 film), a French-language fantasy film
 Beauties of the Night (2016 film), a Mexican documentary film